Margaritha Constantia "Mariette" Van Heerden (born 22 November 1952) is a Zimbabwean former discus thrower and shot puter. Van Heerden was born in Southern Rhodesia but grew up in South Africa and was the holder of South African records in shot put and discus throw as well as a multiple South African champion in both these events (1980 and 1981). She was awarded Springbok colours during the years of the international sports boycott of South Africa.

Van Heerden competed in the discus at the 1984 Summer Olympics, representing Zimbabwe. She also represented Zimbabwe in the discus at the 1982 Commonwealth Games, 1983 World Championships and 1985 African Championships in Athletics. Van Heerden also competed in the shot put at the 1982 Commonwealth Games. 

Van Heerden is still the Zimbabwean record holder in women's shot put (15.58 metres, set on 20 January 1974) and women's discus (55.70 metres, set on 25 March 1984).

Van Heerden moved back to South Africa after 1987 and is the mother of South African swimmer Katheryn Meaklim.

References

1952 births
Living people
South African female shot putters
South African female discus throwers
Athletes (track and field) at the 1984 Summer Olympics
Rhodesian athletes
Zimbabwean female shot putters
Zimbabwean female discus throwers
Olympic athletes of Zimbabwe
Athletes (track and field) at the 1982 Commonwealth Games
Commonwealth Games competitors for Zimbabwe
World Athletics Championships athletes for Zimbabwe
Afrikaner people
White Rhodesian people
Rhodesian people of Dutch descent
White Zimbabwean sportspeople
Zimbabwean people of Dutch descent
Zimbabwean emigrants to South Africa
Place of birth missing (living people)